The 1986 Women's Asian Games Basketball Tournament was held in Seoul, South Korea from September 23, 1986 to October 2, 1986.

Results

Final standing

References
Results

External links
Basketball Results

Women